Glenville F.C. are a football club from Palmerstown, Dublin City in Ireland. The club plays at Palmerstown Community School. Glenville compete in the Leinster Senior League.

The club colours are blue shirts, blue shorts and blue socks.

The club competed in the FAI Cup in 2013, making it to the last 32.

References

Palmerstown
Leinster Senior League (association football) clubs
Association football clubs in Dublin (city)